Strabomantis helonotus, common name: Rio Pitzara robber frog, is a species of frog in the family Strabomantidae.
It is endemic to Ecuador. It is currently only known to inhabit two regions near Rio Pitzara.
Its natural habitats are subtropical or tropical moist lowland forest and subtropical or tropical moist montane forest.
It is threatened by habitat destruction.

References

helonotus
Amphibians of Ecuador
Endemic fauna of Ecuador
Taxonomy articles created by Polbot
Amphibians described in 1975